Roberto Fabián Pompei (born 14 March 1970 in Buenos Aires) is an Argentine former footballer and is currently the manager of Oriente Petrolero. Pompei previously worked as Boca Juniors' youth manager and also as their interim manager on two occasions in 2010. He also managed Peruvian club Deportivo Municipal in 2015.

References

External links
 Argentine Primera statistics at Fútbol XXI 

1970 births
Living people
Footballers from Buenos Aires
Association football midfielders
Argentine footballers
Club Atlético Huracán footballers
Arsenal de Sarandí footballers
Chacarita Juniors footballers
Racing Club de Avellaneda footballers
Estudiantes de La Plata footballers
Boca Juniors footballers
Club Atlético Vélez Sarsfield footballers
Talleres de Remedios de Escalada footballers
Real Oviedo players
Argentine Primera División players
La Liga players
Argentine expatriate footballers
Argentine expatriate sportspeople in Spain
Boca Juniors managers
Club Atlético Huracán managers
Argentine football managers
Oriente Petrolero managers
Club Sol de América managers
Deportivo Municipal managers